Street of the Five Moons (Italian: Via delle Cinque Lune) is a 1942 romantic drama film directed by Luigi Chiarini. It marked the debut of actor Gabriele Ferzetti. It belongs to the movies of the calligrafismo style.

Cast
Luisella Beghi - Ines
Olga Solbelli -Sora Teta
Andrea Checchi - Checco
Gildo Bocci - Federico, padre di Ines
Teresa Franchini - Suor Teresa
Maria Jacobini -  Suor Maria 
Dhia Cristiani - Maria
Ciro Berardi - Pietro, il marito di Anna
Pina Piovani - Anna
Carlo Bressan - Il "professore"
Michele Riccardini - Michele
Aristide Garbini - Romolo
Gorella Gori - La comare grassottella
Gabriele Ferzetti

References

External links

1942 films
Italian romantic drama films
1940s Italian-language films
1942 romantic drama films
Films directed by Luigi Chiarini
Italian black-and-white films
1940s Italian films